Samuel Ward (c. 1963 – 31 October 1992) was the leader of the Irish People's Liberation Organisation's Belfast Brigade. The IPLO was made up of ex-members of the Irish National Liberation Army. Following its split from and feud with the INLA, the IPLO split into two factions, with Ward running one.

He was killed by the Provisional IRA in its 1992 purge of the IPLO's Belfast Brigade and Army Council factions.

References

Sources
Henry McDonald, INLA - Deadly Divisions, Paperback: 469 pages;  Poolbeg Press Ltd (April 26, 2010); ; 

1960s births
1992 deaths
Date of birth missing
Deaths by firearm in Northern Ireland
Irish National Liberation Army members
Irish People's Liberation Organisation
Paramilitaries from Belfast
People killed by the Provisional Irish Republican Army